The 1900 Colorado gubernatorial election was held on November 6, 1900. Democratic nominee James Bradley Orman defeated Republican nominee Frank C. Goudy with 53.78% of the vote.

General election

Candidates
Major party candidates
James Bradley Orman, Democratic
Frank C. Goudy, Republican

Other candidates
James R. Wylie, Prohibition
DeWitt Copley, Socialist Labor
S. B. Hutchinson, Independent
James T. Pearson, People's

Results

References

1900
Colorado
Gubernatorial